In Suprema Petri Apostoli Sede (On the Supreme See of Peter the Apostle), also titled Litterae ad Orientales, i.e. Epistle to the Easterners, is a document – either considered as an apostolic letter or as an encyclical letter – sent by Pope Pius IX in 1848 to the bishops and clergy of the Eastern Orthodox Churches urging them to enter in communion with the Roman Catholic Church.

The document was answered the same year by several leading members of the Eastern Orthodox Church, in the Encyclical of the Eastern Patriarchs, which restated the theological controversies between the two Churches, most notably the dispute over the addition of the Filioque to the Nicene Creed and papal supremacy.

See also 

 
Arcano divinae
Unitatis christianae

Praeclara gratulationis publicae
Orientalium dignitas
Ecclesiastical differences between the Catholic Church and the Eastern Orthodox Church

References

External links 

Documents of Pope Pius IX
1848 documents
19th-century Christian texts
1848 in Christianity
Letters (message)

 Latin version in Pius IX, Pontificis Maximi - Acta, Pars I, Vol I, 1854, p. 78-91 (on Archive.org)
 English translation of the text
French version of the text in Irenikon, 1929